Ann Aluoch Onyango (born 5 January 1990), known as Ann Aluoch, is a Kenyan footballer who plays as a defender. She has been a member of the Kenya women's national team.

International career
Aluoch played for Kenya at the 2016 Africa Women Cup of Nations.

See also
List of Kenya women's international footballers

References

1990 births
Living people
Footballers from Nairobi
Kenyan women's footballers
Women's association football defenders
Kenya women's international footballers
Kenya women's national football team managers